The Hagnaby Chronicle is an important late 13th or early 14th century Latin chronicle from the Premonstratensian Hagnaby Abbey in Lincolnshire, England. It is closely related to the Barlings Chronicle.

References

English chronicles
13th-century Latin books
14th-century Latin books